Moorish Delta 7 (also known as MD7) are a hip hop/UK garage outfit from the Newtown area of Birmingham, England. The trio formed in 1995 and have sold over 50,000 records.

History
Moorish Delta 7 are one of the most influential hip hop groups from the UK. The group formed in 1995 as a growth of the then-large rap outfit Lyric Born Clique. Lyric Born Clique was an eight piece rap collective featuring among many Golden Child, DJ Kinstun, Shortnerve and Rawality. Initially, Moorish Delta 7 had four members with Shortnerve leaving shortly after the first EP. Their first release as 'Moorish Delta 7' was an EP on Quartz Records (another Birmingham record label) called Taking Four Wicked Heads on the Way to North Africa. The EP was a mixture of dark beats, insightful lyrics, street imagery, humour and political comment. The group quickly became known for their high energy performances and quickly became popular with audiences in the UK.

The crew became noticed by the diversity of the groups MCs with Malik providing thoughtful and clever wordplay, Cipher providing the eerie and dark soundtrack and culturally conscious / street impact and Jawar with humorous / street vibe.

Their next release was the 4 track single "The Art of Survival"/"Silent Screams"/"Number 1 Sound"/"Status" in 2001. The group had now evolved their music to include vivid cinematic soundscapes and continued to mix their subject matter switching from social commentary to humour with equal effect.

Their influence on the UK, Birmingham and Midlands hip hop scene had been the dark beats and deep, serious, street orientated subject matter. They also collaborated with a lot of local artists and emphasised their Birmingham heritage when doing shows around the country. They were also involved in a lot of local youth projects around music and art which broadened their grassroots support and were instrumental in breaking several Birmingham based artists onto the national music scene.

The album that followed, The Power & the Glory (2002) continued this theme further and was a great critical and sales success.

They have collaborated with other Midlands artists such as Shimm 1, Hoods Underground, Yogi, Big V, Law, Baby J, Shade 1 who among others formed the collective called Underworld. They have also collaborated with a number artists including: Judge Dredi, Seth Lakeman, Baby J, PJ, Yogi, Shade 1, Midlands Mafia, 25 to Life, Reggiimental, MSI Asylum and Shadowless Productions. Members of the group have now diverged into different areas with Cipher now producing for many different artists and Malik establishing a successful solo career collaborating with Amy Winehouse, Mark Ronson and others.

They have performed alongside DMX, Africa Bambaataa, Guru (Gang Star), Fabulous, Rodney P, 57th Dynasty, Out Da Ville, Mobb Deep, Estelle, DJ 279, Tim Westwood, Brother Ben, Immortal Technique, So Solid Crew, MSI Asylum, Pentalk, Mike GLC, Skinny Man, De La Soul, Royalists, Chubby Kids, Lyric L, Shabbazz the Disciple, Poetic, Freestyle, The Gravediggazz, The A Alikes, Fallacy, Blind Alphabets, Big Daddy Kane, Marley Marl, Jurassic Five, Roc 1, Tiny presents, Graf, BS5, C.O.V, Tubby T, The Villains, Bassman, Heartless Crew, Benjamin Zephaniah, Nicky Blackmarket, Ras Kwame, DJ Semtex, Big P and Skeme, amongst others.

There have been further subsequent releases including Underworld Compilation (featured) and a further album entitled Life in the City (2006).  Even though the group continue to record, it is their earlier work they are most renowned for.

In March 2008, the group collaborated with folk musician Seth Lakeman in a joint BBC and Arts Council England project. A programme named Made in England – Seth Lakeman, directed by Will Sergeant and broadcast on 23 April 2008 on BBC One, followed Seth and Moorish Delta 7 for 48 hours as they produced two records called "Find Your Way" and "Climate Change", which they performed live at The Concrete Bar in the Jewellery Quarter. The program which was made consequently won best regional documentary at the National TV Society awards in November 2008. It also provided a background into the work of the two musical outfits.

Members
Cipher J.E.W.E.L.S – also known as Knowledge Scientific (circa 1998)
Malik
Jawar

Discography

Albums
The Power & the Glory (2002)
Life in the City (2006)

EPs
Taking Four Wicked Heads on the Way to North Africa (1998)

Compilations
The Experiment Vol. 1 (1998)
Black Samurai Vol. 1 (1999)
Black Samurai Vol. 2 (1999)
UK Hip Hop Awards (Album) 2000
Tim Westwood Compilation (Trust the DJ) 2000
Underworld Compilation (2004)

Videos
Their first music video, "The Art of Survival", was one of the earliest MTV playlisted UK rap videos and set the tone for gritty, street related videos to come later.

"Silent Screams" (2002)
"Death Before Dishonour" (2002)
"Don't Leave Me Lonely" (2003)
"The Rain" (2005)
"My Girl" (2006)
"Levels" (2006)
"Bootlegger" (2006)
(Malik) "So Real" (2007)
(Malik) "Blues Ground" (2007)

References

External links
Official website
Official MySpace
Seven Entertainment
Made in England – Seth Lakeman

English hip hop groups
Musical groups from Birmingham, West Midlands
Musical groups established in 1995